Cecilia Barbara Atim Ogwal (born 12 June 1946) is a Ugandan politician, businesswoman and management consultant. She is the Member of Parliament for the Dokolo District Women's Constituency. She has been a member of Uganda's legislature continuously since 1996.

Background and education
Ogwal was born in Dokolo District, Northern Uganda, on 12 June 1946. She attended local schools in Uganda. In 1967, at the age of 21, she was admitted to the University of East Africa in Nairobi (now known as the University of Nairobi) to study for a Bachelor of Commerce degree. She graduated from Nairobi University in 1970. She also holds a Certificate in Human Resources Management from what was then called the Institute of Public Administration, but is now known as Uganda Management Institute. She holds two other certificates; one in Christian Based Values from the Haggai Institute, Singapore, and the other in Public Private Partnership, from Australia.

Career
From 1979 until 1980, Ogwal worked at the Uganda Embassy in Kenya, as the Liaison Officer for Returning Ugandan Refugees. From 1980 until 1981, she worked as the Operations Manager at the Uganda Advisory Board of Trade. In 1982, she was one of the founders of Housing Finance Bank, working there until 1984. She served as the Chairperson of Uganda Development Bank, from 1981 until 1986.

She became involved in Ugandan politics, serving as the Acting Secretary General of Uganda People's Congress (UPC) from 1985 to 1992. In 1994, she was part of the  Constituent Assembly which drafted and promulgated the 1995 Ugandan Constitution. She remained a high-ranking official in the UPC political party until 2004. During the 2006 parliamentary elections, she lost her Lira Municipality seat to Jimmy Akena, the son of UPC founder Milton Obote. In 2011, Ogwal contested and won the Women's Representative seat for the newly created Dokolo District. This time she switched political parties and ran as a member of the Forum for Democratic Change party.

Parliamentary duties
Ogwal is a married mother of seven natural children and a number of adopted ones.

In 1969, at the age of 23, she won the "Miss Uganda" contest. Ogwal is a member of parliamentary Committee of Physical Infrastructure  in charge of overseeing and covering policy matters related to Lands, Housing, Urban development, Works and Transport, and Physical Planning. She is also a member of the budget committee.

See also
 Parliament of Uganda
 Dokolo District

References

External links
Website of the Parliament of Uganda

1946 births
Living people
University of Nairobi alumni
Members of the Parliament of Uganda
People from Dokolo District
People from Northern Region, Uganda
Forum for Democratic Change politicians
20th-century Ugandan women politicians
20th-century Ugandan politicians
21st-century Ugandan women politicians
21st-century Ugandan politicians
Lango people
Women members of the Parliament of Uganda